Brandon Marklund (born June 10, 1996) is a Canadian professional baseball pitcher in the Kansas City Royals organization.

Career
Marklund played college baseball at the Bryan College. After going undrafted in the MLB Draft, he signed with the Auckland Tuatara of the Australian Baseball League. In 14 games pitched, he went 1–0 with a 2.29 earned run average (ERA) and 15 strikeouts.

In January 2019, Marklund signed a minor league deal with the Kansas City Royals after he impressed them in a tryout. He also had a tryout with the Arizona Diamondbacks.

Marklund made his debut in the Royals organization with the Lexington Legends. After the season, he played for the Canada national baseball team in the 2019 WBSC Premier12.

References

External links

1996 births
Living people
Auckland Tuatara players
Expatriate baseball players in New Zealand
Baseball pitchers
Bryan Lions baseball players
Canada national baseball team players
Canadian expatriate baseball players in the United States
Lexington Legends players
Sportspeople from North Vancouver
2019 WBSC Premier12 players
Canadian expatriate sportspeople in New Zealand